Believer(s) or The Believer(s) may refer to:

Religion
 Believer, a person who holds a particular belief
 Believer, a person who holds a particular religious belief
 Believers, Christians with a religious faith in the divine Christ
 Believers (mumin), a term in the Quran for Muslims
 Believers Church, a Pentecostalist church
 Russian Old Believers, a sect who separated from the Muscovite Orthodox Church as a protest against church reforms introduced by Patriarch Nikon between 1652 and 1666

Film
 The Believers, a 1987 neo-noir film by John Schlesinger
 The Believers: Stories from Jewish Havana, a 1994 American documentary short film
 The Believer (2001 film), a film directed by Henry Bean
 Believers (film), a 2007 film directed by Daniel Myrick
 Believer (2018 American film), a HBO LGBT documentary by Don Argott
 Believer (2018 South Korean film), a film by Lee Hae-young
 The Believer (2021 film), an American horror film

Television
 Believer (TV series), a 2017 CNN documentary series presented by Reza Aslan
 "Believers" (Babylon 5), a television episode
 "The Believer" (Grimm), a television episode
 "Chapter 15: The Believer", an episode of The Mandalorian

Literature
 Believer (He Xuntian), a 1993 poem by He Xuntian
 Believers (manga), a manga by Naoki Yamamoto
 The Believer (magazine), a literary magazine
 The Believers (comics), an Indian graphic novel
 The Believers (novel), a 2008 novel by Zoë Heller
 "Al-Mu'minoon" ("The Believers"), twenty-third sura (chapter) of the Qur'an
 The Believers, a 1957 novel by Janice Holt Giles
 The Believers, a 1982 novel by Nicholas Condé

Music
 Believer (band), a Christian thrash metal band

Albums
 Believer (Chic album) or the title song, 1984
 Believer (Laura Dawn album) or the title song, 1999
 Believer (Kutless album) or the title song, 2012
 Believer (Oteil and the Peacemakers album), 2005
 Believer, album by Emily Maguire (singer), 2009
 The Believer (John Coltrane album) or the title song, 1964
 The Believer (Rhett Miller album) or the title song, 2006
 Believers (A. A. Bondy album), 2011
 Believers (Deacon Blue album) or the title song, 2016
 Believers (Don McLean album) or the title song, 1981
 Believers (¡Mayday! album) or the title song, 2013

Songs
  "Believer" (American Authors song), 2013
 "Believer" (DJ Fresh and Adam F song), 2015
 "Believer" (Goldfrapp song), 2010
 "Believer" (Major Lazer and Showtek song), 2016
 "Believer" (Imagine Dragons song), 2017
 "Believers" (song), by Joe Nichols, 2009
 "Believer", by 3 Doors Down from Time of My Life, 2011
 "Believer", by Audio Adrenaline from Kings & Queens, 2013
 "Believer", by Atomic Kitten from Ladies Night, 2003
 "Believer", by Bizarre from Friday Night at St. Andrews, 2010
 "Believer", by BT from the soundtrack of the film Go, 1999
 "Believer", by DJ Muggs from Dust, 2003
 "Believer", by Freemasons, 2010
 "Believer", by Guy Sebastian from T.R.U.T.H., 2020
 "Believer", by Keyshia Cole from Point of No Return, 2014
 "Believer", by Kill Hannah from Until There's Nothing Left of Us, 2006
 "Believer", by Marla Glen, 1993
 "Believer", by Noiseworks, B-side of "Freedom", 1990
 "Believer", by Ozzy Osbourne from Diary of a Madman, 1981
 "Believer", by the Real People, 1992
 "Believer", by Rogue Traders from Here Come the Drums, 2005
 "Believer", by Supergrass, B-side of "Moving", 1999
 "Believer", by Susanna and the Magical Orchestra from List of Lights and Buoys, 2004
 "Believer", by Twice from Eyes Wide Open, 2020
 "Believer: Tabidachi No Uta", by Mikuni Shimokawa, 1999
 "The Believer", by Common from The Dreamer/The Believer, 2011
 "The Believer", by the Luka State, 2015
 "The Believer", by Neil Young from Chrome Dreams II, 2007
 "The Believers", by How to Destroy Angels from How to Destroy Angels, 2010

See also

 Non-believer
 Belief (disambiguation)
 Believe (disambiguation)
 I Believe (disambiguation)
 True believer (disambiguation)
 Unbeliever (disambiguation)
 
 Faith